O'Connor is a surface light rail transit (LRT) stop under construction on Line 5 Eglinton, a new line that is part of the Toronto subway system. It will be located in the Golden Mile neighbourhood at the intersection of Eglinton Avenue and Victoria Park Avenue. It is scheduled to open in 2023.

Description
The stop is located in the middle of Eglinton Avenue East between Victoria Park Avenue and Eglinton Square. The stop has parallel side platforms. Access to the stop will be from both platform ends using an adjacent pedestrian crossing at each of two signalized intersections – at Victoria Park Avenue on the west side of the stop and at Eglinton Square on the east side. Nearby, Traction Power Substation 10 is located on the northwest corner of Eglinton and Victoria Park Avenues; it takes electricity from Toronto Hydro and converts it into the current type needed to power Line 5 trains.

Eglinton Square Shopping Centre is situated on the south side of the street. The streets Eglinton Avenue, Eglinton Square and Victoria Park Avenue enclose the triangular Victoria Park – Eglinton Parkette, which is just south of the O'Connor stop.

History

During the planning stages for Line 5 Eglinton, the stop was given the working name "Victoria Park", which is identical to the pre-existing Victoria Park station on Line 2 Bloor–Danforth. On November 23, 2015, a report to the TTC Board recommended giving a unique name to each station in the subway system, including the on-street surface stops along Line 5. The LRT stop was therefore renamed "O'Connor" after the nearby O'Connor Drive. Using "Eglinton Square" as the name for the stop would be similar to the pre-existing names for Eglinton station and Eglinton West station, the latter to be renamed to "Cedarvale" to avoid confusion with the former. 

In January 2019, the first concrete pour for the surface section of Line 5 occurred at the future O'Connor stop on its Eglinton Square side. Before being encased in concrete, conduit pipes were laid to support communications and power cables for the Crosstown's stations and stops.

Surface connections 

, the following are the proposed connecting routes that would serve this station when Line 5 Eglinton opens:

References

External links

Line 5 Eglinton stations